Connecticut's 27th House of Representatives district elects one member of the Connecticut House of Representatives. It encompasses parts of Newington and has been represented by Democrat Gary Turco since 2019.

Recent elections

2020

2018

2016

2014

2012

References

27